Emmanuel Vasseur (born 3 September 1976) is a French retired footballer.

Career 

Masseur started his career in Calais RUFC, where he made it to the 2000 Coupe de France Final. In 2001, Vasseur signed for Leyton Orient in the English Football League Third Division, where he made two appearances and scored zero goals. After that, he played for French clubs Calais RUFC, Racing Club de France Football, Canet Roussiillon, Union Sportive Gravelines Football, Amicale Pascal Calais and Fort Vert before retiring.

References

External links 
 Taylor lands a giantkiller 
 Vasseur the villain of the fairytale 
 Manu Vasseur, l’éternel numéro 10 
 Le mystérieux Emmanuel Vasseur 
 at Footballdatabase.eu 
 Foot National Profile 
 at Soccerway 
 Soccerbase Profile

Living people
1976 births
French expatriate footballers
Expatriate footballers in England
Racing Club de France Football players
Association football midfielders
French footballers
Leyton Orient F.C. players
Calais RUFC players
Union Sportive Gravelines Football players